Malleastrum depauperatum is a species of plant in the family Meliaceae. It is endemic to Comoros and Aldabra in the Seychelles. It is also known by the synonym Malleastrum leroyi.

References

Flora of Seychelles
depauperatum
Vulnerable plants
Endemic flora of Seychelles
Taxonomy articles created by Polbot
Taxobox binomials not recognized by IUCN